Gabrielle Marion-Rivard is a Canadian actress and singer, who won the Canadian Screen Award for Best Actress in 2014 for her performance in Gabrielle.

Marion-Rivard, who has Williams syndrome, plays a young woman with Williams syndrome who is part of a choir of developmentally disabled people. She participates in a similar choir, based in Montreal, Quebec, in real life.

References

External links

Actresses from Montreal
Best Actress Genie and Canadian Screen Award winners
Canadian women singers
Canadian film actresses
French Quebecers
Living people
Singers from Montreal
Year of birth missing (living people)